Javier Ruiz Caldera (born 1976) is a Spanish film director, primarily known for his comedy films.

Biography 
Born in Viladecans, province of Barcelona, in 1976, Javier Ruiz Caldera graduated from the ESCAC in 2000. Following his beginnings in cinema in the early 2000s underscored by short films such as Treitum and Diminutos del calvario, his 2009 feature debut, Spanish Movie, a spoof film, became a box-office hit in Spain, grossing over 7.6 million € in its  domestic theatrical run.

In addition to his work in cinema, he has also directed episodes of the comedy series Mira lo que has hecho and in El ministerio del tiempo's episode "Tiempo de lo oculto" (2016).

Filmography 
Director (feature films)

References 

1976 births
Living people
Film directors from Catalonia
Spanish film directors
Spanish television directors